Sledgehammer Blues is an audiophile record label owned by Valley Entertainment. It was formerly named AudioQuest Music.

Audioquest Music was founded in 1990 by Joe Harley of the audio cable company Audioquest to demonstrate the quality of its cables. Harley made one album, by blues guitarist Robert Lucas, that was so successful he decided to release more jazz and blues. Its catalogue included work by Charles Fambrough, Victor Lewis, James Newton, Edward Simon, and Larry Willis.

From the label's website: "The blues label was founded in the late 1980s with the mission to create the highest standard audiophile recordings based on the technology available. These are analog recordings using custom built tube electronics and eschewing noise reduction, compression, equalization or sound limiters. By recording the most proficient artists available at the highest possible standards, these recordings have been adapted to every subsequent audiophile platform-XRCD, SACD, etc."

Discography

References

External links
Sledgehammer Blues on Valley-Entertainment.com

Audiophile record labels
Jazz record labels